Kümmel, kummel or kimmel, is a sweet, colourless liqueur flavoured with caraway seeds, cumin and fennel.

Some historians state that Lucas Bols (1652-1719) first distilled kümmel liqueur in the Netherlands in 1675. It was then taken to Germany and to Russia; the former is now the principal producer and consumer of kümmel.

History 
Kümmel's popularity grew in the early 19th century, being produced by 1823 in Allasch, the Governorate of Livonia in Russian Empire (modern , Latvia). Kümmel was produced by the Baltic German aristocrat, Baron von Blanckenhagen, who owned land around Allasch which included a pure and reliable water source.

In the mid-19th Century, kümmel was the rival of gin. Being made with caraway rather than juniper, it had one main advantage: caraway has a calmative effect, reducing flatulence and the bloated feeling experienced after a heavy meal. By 1850, this "medicinal" benefit helped Ludwig Mentzendorff create a healthy business importing kümmel to Britain.

During the 1905 Russian Revolution, the Blanckenhagen mansion was burned down. The distillery closed, and the entrepreneurial Mentzendorffs opened up the production of their own kümmel in France. Baltic Germans moved to Germany as tensions between Russia and Germany grew, and several distilleries in Germany produced their own versions of kümmel, where it is still known as Allasch and is a popular digestif.

In the UK, it is a popular drink at many of the more traditional golf clubs. Because of its rumored ability to steady the nerves of golfers there, it acquired the nickname of "putting mixture".

Allasch

Allasch is a variety of Kümmel; it is also a caraway liqueur of around 40% ABV, usually flavoured with bitter almonds, anise, angelica root and orange peel.

Invented in 1823 in Allasch, Governorate of Livonia, Russian Empire (now  in Latvia), a von Blanckenhagen family property, it was widely popular and produced there until 1944 when the Soviet Union re-occupied Latvia and expelled ethnic Germans from the region.

In 1830, Allasch was exhibited at the Leipzig Trade Fair and quickly gained popularity, being soon produced by local distilleries. It is now considered a Leipzig specialty, usually drunk as a digestif, although there are also manufacturers outside Leipzig.

In Latvia, it is produced by Latvijas Balzams under the Latvianized name "Allažu ķimelis".

A charming and evocative scene of drinking kümmel occurs in Rainer Werner Fassbinder's television miniseries, "Berlin Alexanderplatz" (1980), where the character Franz Biberkopf speaks in the voices of glasses of kümmel and three beers in a philosophical dialogue as he evaluates the taste and downs each drink in turn.

References

Herbal liqueurs